WFGH is a Variety formatted broadcast radio station licensed to Fort Gay, West Virginia, serving Wayne County in West Virginia and Lawrence County in Kentucky.  WFGH is owned and operated by Wayne County Board of Education under General Manager Fred Damron at Wayne High School. It was started by Hazel Damron in 1979 and has served Wayne County since.

The station went off the air due to budget cuts on July 1, 2017, but was immediately revived on July 3, 2017 by the community group Friends of WFGH.

References

External links
 WFGH 90.7 Online
 
 
 

FGH